"Dancing Alone" is a song by Swedish dance music duo Axwell & Ingrosso featuring English singer-songwriter RØMANS. It was released on 29 June 2018. The song was written by Axwell, Sebastian Ingrosso, Axel Hedfors, RØMANS and Richard Zastenker.

Track listing

Charts

Weekly charts

Year-end charts

References

2018 singles
2018 songs
Axwell & Ingrosso songs
Songs written by Axwell
Songs written by Sebastian Ingrosso